Su Elliott (born 18 December 1950) is a British actress.

She was born in Newcastle upon Tyne, Northumberland, England. Her film roles include Alice in The Zany Adventures of Robin Hood (1984), a nurse in The Girl in a Swing (1988), Marthe in Giorgino (1994), Mrs Brabin in Purely Belter (2000), a pub customer in The Hitchhiker's Guide to the Galaxy (2005), a Ministry of Magic witch in Harry Potter and the Goblet of Fire (2005), and Hannah in Jane Eyre (2011). Elliott has appeared in numerous British television productions, including The Secret Diary of Adrian Mole, Travelling Man, Hi-de-Hi!, The Bill, This Life, Auf Wiedersehen, Pet, Inspector Morse, Black Books, Coronation Street, King Leek and EastEnders.

She also appeared in Central Independent Television's Halloween special The Worst Witch as Agatha's assistant, Delilah.

Filmography

External links 

1950 births
English film actresses
Living people